Juan Aguirre (born 30 December 1970) is a Spanish rower. He competed in the men's coxless four event at the 1992 Summer Olympics.

References

External links

1970 births
Living people
Spanish male rowers
Olympic rowers of Spain
Rowers at the 1992 Summer Olympics